Calthorpe Broad is a  biological Site of Special Scientific Interest east of Stalham in Norfolk. It is a Nature Conservation Review site, Grade I and a national nature reserve. It is also part of the Broadland Ramsar site and Special Protection Area, and The Broads Special Area of Conservation.

This broad has diverse fauna and flora. Water plants include mare's-tail, water violet,  blunt-leaved pondweed, spiked water-milfoil, floating scirpus, yellow water-lily and the nationally scarce water soldier.

The site is private land with no public access.

References

Sites of Special Scientific Interest in Norfolk
National nature reserves in England
Norfolk Broads
Nature Conservation Review sites
Ramsar sites in England
Special Protection Areas in England
Special Areas of Conservation in England